DOAS may refer to:

 Death of a Salesman
 Dedicated outdoor air system
 Differential optical absorption spectroscopy
 Doas (Software)